Marauders is an ongoing comic book series published by Marvel Comics beginning in 2019 starring the X-Men.

Publication history
Marauders was announced in July 2019 as one of the six launch titles for Marvel's Dawn of X initiative, a franchise-wide reset of the status quo of the X-Men series created by Jonathan Hickman. In October 2019, issue one was launched as a sister book to the flagship X-Men title, featuring a team of X-Men traveling the world by ship to protect mutantkind.

Plot
When Kitty Pryde, now going by Kate, attempts to enter a gateway to Krakoa for the first time, she is unable to pass through and breaks her nose. Kate instead steals a boat and sails to the island where she is greeted by Wolverine, Iceman and Storm. She is contacted by Emma Frost who explains to her that some of the human nations of the world refuse to recognize Krakoa's sovereignty, have rejected the offer of life-saving Krakoan drugs and refuse to let their mutant citizens enter the new mutant homeland. Iceman then heads through a gateway leading him to Russia where he is attacked by the military, who are using power-dampening technology to block access to Krakoa. Kate, Storm, Iceman and a newly-resurrected Pyro sail to Russia and take out the blockade, allowing the mutants passage. Emma offers Kate the chance to captain her own ship so that she can protect Krakoa's interests and she agrees. In London, Emma chastises Sebastian Shaw for his carelessness in running the Hellfire Trading Company's black market accounts and the two clash over their designs for the vacant seat on Krakoa's Council. The Marauders defeat a crew of thieves led by Batroc the Leaper that had stolen some of Krakoa's medicine before rendezvousing with Bishop in Taipei, who is investigating the disappearance of the husband of Mrs. Zhao, an anti-mutant socialite. Shaw has The Five resurrect his son Shinobi, with plans on crowning him the Red King but he is thwarted by Emma, who undermines him and appoints Kate as the Red Queen, meaning she now sits on the Council, with Kate subsequently appointing Bishop as her Red Bishop. Enraged, Shaw reluctantly makes Shinobi his Black Bishop but promises him the Red Council seat soon, revealing that Kate and Emma were responsible for his death.

While Iceman, Storm and Pyro rescue some mutants in Brazil, Kate and Bishop discover that Mrs. Zhao had locked her own husband away and blamed it on the mutants to increase tensions. They release the husband, who now worships mutants as gods following the establishment of Krakoa, embarrassing Zhao who partners with the Homines Verendi, a human supremacy group based in Madripoor, in the hopes of getting revenge. Iceman meets with Emma's White Bishop, her brother Christian, with whom he has begun a casual relationship. Christian offers Iceman a place on his crew but he refuses and Christian theorises that Iceman and Storm are staying so close to Kate because, as she has been unable to access Krakoa, they fear that The Five will be unable to resurrect her should she die. Christian arrives at a Hellfire Company meeting where Shaw attempts to divert the Marauders to Madripoor. Although Christian abstains from the vote, Emma and Kate vote for Shinobi to continue his route to Madripoor but they soon receive news that his boat has come into conflict and needs help. When the Marauders arrive, they are attacked by soldiers lead by Zhao and Donald Pierce wearing power-dampening armor who were sent by Homines Verendi. During the fight, Yellowjacket, an agent of Verendi, sneaks into Pyro's bloodstream so that he can spy on the team. The Marauders split up, with Kate tasked with transporting the armor to Krakoa so it can be researched. Once alone, Shaw ambushes her and leaves her to drown so that he can claim her Council seat for Shinobi.

Emma meets with Callisto and invites her to be her White Knight, which she agrees to as long as Emma funds an enclave in Arizona for the Morlocks to live. Homines Verendi meet with the Russian ambassador and offer to sell her intel on Krakoa that they have obtained from Yellowjacket in exchange for their power-dampening technology. Bishop attacks a Verendi group and sneaks aboard their ship where he finds Kate's dead body. He telepathically calls to Emma, who arrives with Iceman and Christian to rescue them. Enraged, Iceman almost kills the Verendi soldiers using his Omega-level powers as revenge for killing Kate but Bishop talks him down. Storm confronts Emma, blaming her for Kate's death but Emma tells Storm she is hopeful that there may be a way to bring her back. Shinobi appoints Fenris as the Black Knight. Emma detects Yellowjacket inside Pyro and teams up with the Stepford Cuckoos to trap him in an illusion to find out what he knows. After she and Pyro psychically project to Verendi and warn them not to interfere with mutant affairs, the Marauders and Forge destroy the Russian ship transporting the power-dampening tech. At Kate's funeral Lockheed appears before a grieving Emma and she discovers that Shaw murdered Kate. After initial difficulties, The Five are able resurrect Kate, who plans her revenge.

Kate and Emma storm the Black Keep and Kate attacks Shaw, who is unable to defend himself with his powers after Emma shoots him with a power-dampening bullet. Shaw attempts to convince Kate that he gave her a gift by killing her, as her death and subsequent resurrection have removed all doubt that she is a mutant but Kate continues to attack him. Emma explains to Shaw that Kate will now be in charge of the Hellfire Trading Company's black market deals and Shinobi, whom she mind-read to determine that he did not know of his father's plan to kill Kate, will deal with the more mundane elements of the business or else she will reveal to the Council that he murdered Kate and he be exiled. Storm then arrives with Lockheed, who bites out Shaw's eye as punishment before he is poisoned by Kate using Verendi chemicals, with Storm stating that, should he die, she will ensure he is not resurrected for a long time. Callisto convinces Storm to kill her so that she can be resurrected with all of her mutant powers. Emma begins making plans for the Hellfire Gala, a state dinner to be held on Krakoa inviting the human heads of state from around the world, with Kate extending an invitation to Zhao and the rest of Verendi. The Marauders begin buying properties in Madripoor's poorest areas and converting them into hospitals and schools as a sign of defiance towards the Verendi government, though it backfires when Verendi release their newly-created Reavers onto the island. Callisto sends the Morlocks to take care of the situation to avoid an international incident.

In the last issues:
 Wilhelmina Kensington leaves the Homines Verendi.
 it is discovered that Lourdes Chantel (Shaw's former fiancée) is alive, having faked her death with Emma's help and through Wilson Fisk's contacts. She returns to the fold and encounters Shaw in Krakoa.
 Shaw reveals to a revived Harry Leland that Shinobi is not his biological son, but Leland's.
 Iceman and Christian Frost leave the team on a sabbatical, while Pyro goes on book tour.
 Shaw and Emma abdicate from Hellfire Trading to focus on the Quiet Council full-time, with their positions being taken over by Lourdes and the Cuckoos.
 Kate makes a deal with Mister Fantastic in order to allow her to pass through Krakoan gates.

Volume 2
As part of the Destiny of X revamp, writer Steve Orlando is set to take the helm of the book with a second volume and a new main cast: Kate Pryde, Bishop, Tempo, Daken, Aurora, Psylocke (Kwannon), and new character Somnus. Their first stint together will make them cross paths with X-Men 2099'''s villain Brimstone Love.Marauders Annual #1. Marvel Comics, 2022.

Members
In 2019, the X-Men's splinter team debuted in Marauders'' #1.

Supporting Characters 
Chen Zhao
Christian Frost
Lourdes Chantel
Masque
Morlocks
Modus Verendi
Shinobi Shaw

Cast

Prints

Collected editions

References

Marvel Comics
2019 comics debuts
Superhero comics
American comics